Safety is the condition of being protected against harmful conditions or events, or the control of hazards to reduce risk.

Safety may also refer to:

Places
 Safety Island, Antarctica

Government 
  The Internet Stopping Adults Facilitating the Exploitation of Today's Youth Act, also known as SAFETY, a United States bill introduced in 2009
 SAFETY Act, a provision of the Homeland Security Act in the United States

Music
 Safety (album), a 2002 album by Ty Tabor
 Safety (EP), a 1998 EP by Coldplay

Sports
 Safety (cue sports), an intentional defensive shot
 Safety (gridiron football position), a type of defensive back
 Safety (gridiron football score), a type of scoring play
 Safety bicycle, an alternative to the penny-farthing

Computing
 Safety (distributed computing), a class of guarantees in distributed computing
 Memory safety and type safety, classes of guarantees in programming languages

Films
 Safety (2019 film), a French live-action short film
 Safety (2020 film), an American sports drama film

Other
 Safety (firearms), a mechanism that prevents the discharge of a firearm when engaged

See also 
 :Category:Occupational safety and health